Ali Abdolmaleki (Persian علی عبدالمالکی; born 17 August 1988 in Tehran, Iran) is an Iranian pop singer, songwriter, composer and arranger. He made several hit songs in young age . He contributes as one of the leading Iranian pop music composers.

Albums

Studio albums

Extended albums

References

External links
 Ali Abdolmaleki on Spotify
 
 

Lur people
1988 births
Living people
Iranian pianists
Iranian composers
People from Tehran
Iranian guitarists
Iranian pop singers
Singers from Tehran
Iranian male singers
Iranian music arrangers
Persian-language singers
Iranian singer-songwriters
21st-century Iranian male singers